The Anglican Diocese of Ilesa South West is one of 19 within the Anglican Province of Ibadan, itself one of 14 provinces within the Church of Nigeria. The current bishop is Samuel Egbebunmi.

References

Church of Nigeria dioceses
Dioceses of the Province of Ibadan